Teyonah Parris is an American actress. Her first prominent career role was playing secretary Dawn Chambers in the AMC drama series Mad Men (2012–2015) and starring in the 2014 independent film Dear White People. Since that, Parris starred in Spike Lee's film Chi-Raq, in US soap opera Empire and in Academy-nominated film If Beale Street Could Talk. In 2021, Parris portrayed an adult Monica Rambeau in the Marvel Cinematic Universe Disney+ series WandaVision. She will reprise the role in The Marvels, scheduled to be released in 2023.

Parris has won two Black Reel Awards and received nominations at Screen Actors Guild Awards and NAACP Image Awards.

Early life and education
Parris was born on September 22, 1987 and raised in Hopkins, South Carolina. She was accepted into the South Carolina Governor's School for the Arts & Humanities where she finished 11th and 12th grade, before attending and graduating from the Juilliard School.

Career
She made her television debut in 2010, with a guest-starring role on The Good Wife.  In 2012, she was cast in a recurring role as Dawn Chambers in the AMC drama series, Mad Men. She played the first major African American character on Mad Men.

In 2014, Parris had her breakthrough role in the independent film Dear White People. Later in that year, Parris began starring in the Starz comedy series, Survivor's Remorse. In 2015, Parris went to star in the satirical drama film Chi-Raq directed by Spike Lee. She received her first NAACP Image Award for Outstanding Actress in a Motion Picture nomination for this film. She played the leading role in Where Children Play directed by Leila Djansi, and starred alongside David Oyelowo in Five Nights in Maine. Later in 2015, she played R&B/Jazz singer Miki Howard in the biopic The Miki Howard Story.

In 2016, Parris was cast as lead character in the period drama film Buffalo Soldier Girl about a woman who, disguised as a man, enlisted and fought with the African American Post Civil War era as a Buffalo Soldier. In 2017, she had a recurring role on the Fox prime time soap opera Empire playing Detective Pamela Rose. In early 2018, Parris was cast in a leading role on the CBS drama pilot Murder. Also that year, she co-starred in If Beale Street Could Talk, a drama film written and directed by Barry Jenkins and based on James Baldwin's novel of the same name. She played the lead role of Kaneisha in the 2018 Off-Broadway production of Slave Play at the New York Theatre Workshop.

Parris plays the adult version of Monica Rambeau (introduced in the Marvel Cinematic Universe film Captain Marvel) in the Disney+ series WandaVision. She will reprise the role in The Marvels scheduled to be released July 2023.

Personal life
In September 2022, Parris announced that she was five months pregnant with her first child.

Filmography

Film

Television

Awards and nominations

References

External links

American film actresses
American television actresses
Living people
21st-century American actresses
Actresses from South Carolina
People from Hopkins, South Carolina
African-American actresses
Juilliard School alumni
21st-century African-American women
21st-century African-American people
1987 births